Eastern Townships Bank was founded in 1859 by Colonel Benjamin Pomroy (1800–1875). It was the first financial institution in the south-east of Quebec, an area known as the Eastern Townships, and issued its own banknotes.

Within a year after its founding, the bank had opened three branches. After consolidating its presence in the Eastern Townships, it opened branches elsewhere in Quebec and in Western Canada (including Grand Forks, British Columbia and Taber, Alberta). By 1911, it had over 100 branches. To increase its presence on a national scale, its shareholders agreed to merge, effective March 1, 1912, with the Canadian Bank of Commerce, which later became Canadian Imperial Bank of Commerce.

The former branch of the Eastern Townships Bank at the corner of Saint Catherine Street and Crescent Street in Montreal was used as the flagship store for Parasuco, a line of denim clothing. The building is now vacant.

The former head office building of the Eastern Townships Bank in Sherbrooke, Quebec is now an art museum, the Musée des beaux-arts de Sherbrooke.

Presidents

 Benjamin Pomroy 1859-1874 - founder
 Richard William Heneker 1874-1902 - prominent businessman in Eastern Townships and Mayor of Sherbrooke, Quebec
 William Farwell 1902-1912 - last president and Mayor of Sherbrooke, Quebec

See also

List of banks in Canada

References
Musée des beaux-arts de Sherbrooke

Defunct banks of Canada
Banks established in 1859
Banks disestablished in 1912
Canadian Imperial Bank of Commerce
1859 establishments in Canada
Companies based in Sherbrooke
1912 disestablishments in Quebec
1912 mergers and acquisitions